The expansion of Heathrow Airport is a series of proposals to add to the runways at London's busiest airport beyond its two long runways which are  intensively used to serve four terminals and a large cargo operation. The plans are those presented by Heathrow Airport Holdings and an independent proposal by Heathrow Hub with the main object of increasing capacity.

In early December 2006, the Department for Transport published a progress report on the strategy which confirmed the original vision of expanding the runways. In November 2007 the government started a public consultation on its proposal for a slightly shorter third runway and a new passenger terminal.

The plan was publicly supported by many businesses, the aviation industry, the British Chambers of Commerce, the Confederation of British Industry, the Trades Union Congress and the then Labour government. It was publicly opposed by Conservative and Liberal Democrat parties as opposition parties and then as a coalition government, by Boris Johnson (then Mayor of London), many environmental, local advocacy groups and prominent individuals. Although the expansion was cancelled on 12 May 2010 by the new coalition government, the Airport Commission published its various-options comparative study "Final Report" on 1 July 2015 which preferred the plan.

On 25 October 2016, a new northwest runway and terminal was adopted as central Government policy. In late June 2018, the resultant National Policy Statement: Airports was debated and voted on by the House of Commons; the House voted 415–119 in favour of the third runway, within which outcome many local MPs, including a majority of those from London, opposed or abstained.

On 27 February 2020, in an application for judicial review brought by environmental campaigning groups, London councils, and the Mayor of London, Sadiq Khan, the Court of Appeal ruled that the government's decision to proceed with building the third runway were unlawful, as the government's commitments to combat climate change under the Paris Agreement were not taken into account. In response, the government announced it would not appeal against the decision, but Heathrow announced its intention to appeal to the Supreme Court.

On 16 December 2020, the UK Supreme Court lifted the ban on the third runway, allowing a planning application via a Development Consent Order to go ahead. However as of 2023 largely post-COVID pandemic, falling passenger numbers and concerns about investment costs have stalled the project.

Plans

Third runway and additional terminal 

The government would encourage the airport operator (BAA) to apply for planning permission and to carry out the work. The government anticipated that the new runway would be operational in 2015 or soon after. In 2009 the government stipulated it would limit extra flights to 125,000 per year until 2020, rather than the full capacity of circa 222,000. The third runway plans drafted involve compulsory acquisition and demolition of approximately 700 homes for which 125% market value would be paid to compensate families.

In January 2009 more detailed plans for a third runway were government backed subject to funding, legal and parliamentary approval, together with a terminal which would include a Heathrow Hub railway station to provide the first extra-London rail link using the Great Western Main Line, perhaps at the global definition of "high speed", involving the national High Speed 2 new railway project.

In March 2010 the route for High Speed 2 was announced. It did not include a direct connection with Heathrow, but did include a new station at Old Oak Common before reaching the London terminus of Paddington – also served by Crossrail.

On 12 May 2010, expansion was cancelled as part of the coalition agreement agreed by the new Conservative-Liberal Democrat government. BAA formally dropped its plans on 24 May 2010. However, London First, a lobby group representing many of London's businesses and major employers, continued to press the coalition government to rethink their opposition to the expansion of the airport.

On 1 July 2015, the Airports Commission recommended the third runway with further terminal, with a projected capacity (on completion) of 740,000 flights per year.

On 25 June 2018, the House of Commons voted 415–119 in favour of the third runway. The project has received approval from most of the government. A judicial review of the decision was launched by four London boroughs affected by the expansion – Wandsworth, Richmond, Hillingdon and Hammersmith & Fulham – in partnership with Greenpeace and London mayor Sadiq Khan. Khan had previously said he would take legal action if it were passed by Parliament.

Northwest runway 
In July 2013, the airport submitted three new proposals for expansion to the Airports Commission, which was established to review airport capacity in south-east England. The commission was chaired by Howard Davies who, at the time of his appointment was in the employ of GIC Private Limited and a member of its International Advisory Board. Since 2012, GIC Private Limited has been one of Heathrow's principal owners. Davies resigned these positions upon confirmation of his appointment to lead the Airports Commission, although it has been observed that he failed to identify these interests when invited to complete the commission's register of interests. Each of the three proposals that were to be considered by the Commission involved the construction of a third runway, to either the north, the north-west or the south-west of the current airport site.

The Commission released its interim report in December 2013. This shortlisted three options:
the north-west third runway option at Heathrow
extending an existing runway at Heathrow
a second runway at Gatwick Airport

The full report was published on 1 June 2015; this confirmed the north-west runway and a new sixth terminal as the commission's chosen proposal. The Commission estimated the cost as around £18.6 billion; £4 billion higher than Heathrow's own estimate.

The north-west runway and terminal plan was approved by Government on 25 October 2016. In January 2018, in a public consultation, Heathrow unveiled another option with the new runway  shorter, to reduce costs from £16.8 billion to £14.3 billion.

The financing of the expansion has yet to be arranged; Heathrow Airport Holdings' finances are already highly leveraged. In 2017 borrowings were £13.4 billion, with shareholder equity of only £0.7 billion.

Support

Reasons for expansion 
The principal argument stated in favour of expanding Heathrow is to enhance the economic growth of the UK. As the UK's major hub airport, Heathrow can attract many transfer passengers, and so can support a very wide range of direct flight destinations at high frequencies. It is the world's second busiest airport, based on numbers of international passengers. The government claims that Heathrow's connectivity helps London (and nearby counties) especially compete with other European cities for business investment, which in turn produces economic benefits for the rest of the UK. Should Heathrow's connectivity decline compared to London's European competitors, the UK would fall behind.

The government's argument is that Heathrow is on the brink of suffering a decline in connectivity. Heathrow's runways are now operating at around 99% capacity, which increases delays when flights are disrupted, and risks competing European airports gaining destinations (at Heathrow's loss). The government estimates that building a third runway would allow Heathrow to increase its connectivity, bringing £5.5bn of economic benefits over the period 2020–2080. However, the British Chambers of Commerce estimated the economic benefits are £30 billion for the UK economy over the same time scale, and has also stated that every year the programme is delayed costs the UK between £900 million and £1.1 billion.

Some of the capacity added to Heathrow by the new third runway could be used to reinstate or improve flight connections to UK cities. Several cities have seen their connections to Heathrow reduced or lost over recent years as airlines have reallocated the airport's limited capacity to more profitable long-haul flights.

It was suggested that a third runway would increase Heathrow's resilience to disruption, and so reduce emissions from aircraft waiting to land.

Construction was estimated to provide up to 60,000 jobs. Operating the expanded Heathrow was expected to create up to 8,000 new jobs at Heathrow by 2030, with multiplier benefits to West London.

Supporters 
The UK's Brown ministry took the lead in driving forward the expansion of Heathrow. The particular members of that government most closely associated with that drive were the prime minister Gordon Brown and past Transport Secretaries Alistair Darling, Ruth Kelly, Geoff Hoon and Andrew Adonis. Peter Mandelson, the then Business Secretary, also voiced his support for the scheme.

The majority of the UK Conservative Party leadership including former Chancellor George Osborne was also in favour of expansion.

The stance of both Labour and the Conservatives was broadly supported by a number of groups and prominent individuals:
 Aviation sector: including BAA Limited and Flying Matters.
 Airlines: including All Nippon Airways, British Airways, Delta Air Lines, easyJet, Singapore Airlines and Virgin Atlantic.
 Airports: including Glasgow Airport, Liverpool John Lennon Airport, Leeds Bradford Airport, Newcastle International Airport and Aberdeen Airport.
 Business organisations: Confederation of British Industry, British Chambers of Commerce and 32 local chambers of commerce, including the London Chamber of Commerce and West London Business.
Local authorities: Slough
 Manufacturing & freight sector: including the Freight Transport Association, the British International Freight Association, the EEF, Segro and Black & Decker.
 Trade unions: including the GMB Union, Trades Union Congress and Unite the Union.
However, since 21 November 2022, the CEO of Virgin Atlantic Shai Weiss indicated a pause in the company's support for the expansion of Heathrow, announcing support had moved from 'unequivocal' to 'tentative', mentioning Heathrow's increase of passenger charges as a reason.

Advocacy in support of expansion 
In May 2007, the British Airports Authority (BAA) and several other companies involved with aviation established Flying Matters to lobby the UK government and generally advocate for the development of the airport following on from a suggestion from Sir Richard Branson of Virgin Atlantic that aviation industry needed to develop a shared solution to climate change. The organisation was created to help demonstrate that the aviation sector was "taking climate change seriously". In 2009 Greenpeace acquired and published a detailed confidential report into the group activities and plans which claimed that The Department for Transport was independently approaching Flying Matters for support on key issues on the Climate change bill.

Prior to the 2007 party conferences Flying Matters issued a number of press releases aimed at the Conservative Party which challenged their opposition to the third runway: "Voters in key marginals shun Conservative proposals for higher taxes on air travel", "'Green' holiday tax plan puts Conservatives 6 per cent behind Labour in 30 most important marginals in the Country","Families will be priced out of air travel if Heathrow fails to expand" and "Stopping new runways would cost half a million new UK jobs". The objectives outlined in the leaked 'draft Strategy and programme for 2009–10' later confirmed that the organisation felt that it was "Essential to help establish a foundation from which the Conservatives could amend their position post election". The organisation's budget for 2008–2009 was £390 thousand.

Lobbying 

The aviation sector had close links with political decision makers which many players moving between roles through the controversial 'revolving door'. For example: Joe Irvin was advisor to John Prescott from 1996 and 2001 (Secretary of State for the Environment, Transport and the Regions as well as Deputy Prime Minister) before working for various element of the aviation lobby and becoming head of corporate affairs at BAA in 2006 before he became 'Special Advisor' to Gordon Brown in 2007 when he became prime minister. He was succeeded at BAA by Tom Kelly who took the title 'group director of corporate and public affairs' and had been official spokesman for Tony Blair when he was prime minister.

Freedom to Fly was formed during the preparation phase of the "Future of Aviation white paper 2003" by BAA and others It was 'fronted' by Joe Irvin, a former political adviser to John Prescott who subsequently became Director of Public Affairs at BAA Limited Their director, Dan Hodges, is the son of Glenda Jackson, Labour MP and former Aviation Minister.

Opposition

Greenhouse gas emissions 
Environmental objections have included that the increased  emissions caused by the additional flights will add to global warming. They have argued that claimed economic benefits would be more than wiped out by the cost of the  emissions. The government estimated that a third runway would generate an extra 210.8 Mt (million tons)  annually, but in cost-benefits analysis costs this at £13.33 per ton using 2006 prices, giving a 2020–2080 "cost" of £2.8bn. This is a small fraction of the government's own official estimate of the cost of carbon, which rises from £32.90 in 2020 to £108.20 in 2080 (in 2007 prices). If these figures are used, the carbon cost of the third runway alone rises to £13.3bn (2006 prices), enough to wipe out the economic benefits. However, the British Chambers of Commerce released a report stating the economic benefits as £30 billion over the same time scale, considerably more than the carbon cost of the expansion.

However, the then Transport Secretary Ruth Kelly stated that carbon emissions would not actually rise overall in the environment, since carbon trading would be used to ensure that these increases from Heathrow are offset by reductions elsewhere in the economy (although such schemes do not account for the fact that aviation carbon emissions cause more harm owing to their being emitted at a higher altitude).

Community destruction 
Some 700 homes, a church and eight Grade II-listed buildings would have to be demolished or abandoned, the high street in Harmondsworth split, a graveyard "bulldozed" and the "entire village of Sipson could disappear". John McDonnell, MP for Hayes and Harlington, suggested in 2007 that up to 4,000 houses would actually have to be demolished or abandoned, but aviation minister Jim Fitzpatrick defended the plans, saying anyone evicted from their home as a result of expansion would be fully compensated. BAA has committed to preserving the Grade I-listed parish church and Great Barn at Harmondsworth, and has given assurances that the value of properties affected by a possible third runway will be protected.

Noise pollution 
Building a third runway at Heathrow would expose hundreds of thousands of residents in London and Berkshire to sustained high levels of aircraft noise for the first time.

Subsidiary arguments 
 There are alternatives to a third runway that maintain London's connectivity (see below).
 Reductions in emissions caused by fewer aircraft delays (a buffer of spare capacity) and a few fewer flights from some regional airports would be dwarfed by the increased emissions from the additional flights serving Heathrow, as reflected by the promise to open up many airports not currently connected which will now connect to the UK.
 Job creation claims are invalid. If the money supporting the new jobs generated by a third runway was not spent at an expanded Heathrow, it would be spent elsewhere in the economy.

Opponents of expansion 

Three House of Commons-represented political parties, many advocacy groups, associations and prominent people are publicly opposed to expansion. Notably:
 Plaid Cymru (including its five MPs at the time of the June 2018 vote on whether to approve the National Policy Statement)
 The Liberal Democrats (including thus all 11 MPs at the June 2018 vote, however it gained six MPs from defections of which five voted for expansion in 2018).
The Green Party (including its MP).
 of London Labour MPs: Rosena Allin-Khan, Diane Abbott, Dawn Butler, Lyn Brown, Karen Buck, Ruth Cadbury, Jeremy Corbyn, Marsha De Cordova, Jon Cruddas, John Cryer, Janet Daby, Emma Dent Coad, Clive Efford, Barry Gardiner, Helen Hayes, Kate Hoey, Rupa Huq, Sarah Jones, Shadow chancellor John McDonnell, Kate Osamor, Teresa Pearce, Matthew Pennycook, Steve Reed, Ellie Reeves, Andy Slaughter, Keir Starmer, Emily Thornberry, Catherine West
 of London Conservative MPs: Bob Blackman, Zac Goldsmith, Justine Greening, Greg Hands, Matthew Offord, and Theresa Villiers. The 2018 vote drew five absences/abstentions from others in the nineteen.
 Sadiq Khan, the Mayor of London, and his predecessors, Boris Johnson and Ken Livingstone.
 International campaign groups criticising expansion of fossil-fuel powered passenger aviation (foremost group: Plane Stupid) and local anti-aviation impacts groups (foremost group: Hacan ClearSkies).
 24 local authorities (including the London Borough of Hillingdon)
 Environmental campaign groups: Greenpeace, RSPB, Friends of the Earth and WWF 
 The National Trust
 Developmental charities: Oxfam, Christian Aid

Advocacy against expansion 

Various methods were proposed and adopted in attempt to halt expansion:

The Conservatives and Liberal Democrats opposed construction and cancelled expansion when elected in the 2010 general election.

In August 2007, the Camp for Climate Action took place within a mile of Heathrow. The camp ran for a week and on its final day some 1000–1400 people protested and 200 people blockaded British Airports Authority HQ. Before the camp BAA requested the "mother of all injunctions" which could have restricted the movements of 5 million people from 15 different organisations, including the RSPB, Greenpeace, the Campaign for the Protection of Rural England, the Woodland Trust, Friends of the Earth, and the National Trust. The injunction would technically have included the Queen; patron of the RSPB and CPRE, Prince Charles; in his position as President of the National Trust, and even some of BAA's own staff.

In February 2008, five members of Plane Stupid who have resisted expansion throughout the process staged a 2-hour protest on the roof of the Palace of Westminster (Houses of Parliament) in protest at the close links between BAA and the government. Two large banners were unfurled which read "BAA HQ" and "No 3rd runway at Heathrow".

In April 2008, Plane Stupid claimed that their group was infiltrated by Toby Kendall, 24, an employee of C2i International. The Times reported that he had gone undercover in the group using the name of "Ken Tobias." Airport operator, BAA, who have often been a target of Plane Stupid's campaign, confirmed to The Times that they had been in contact with C2i International but denied ever hiring the company. C2i offered their clients "The ability to operate effectively and securely in a variety of hostile environments". and at the time listed 'aerospace' at the top of a list of industries for which it worked.

In January 2009, Greenpeace and partners (including actress Emma Thompson and impressionist Alistair McGowan) bought a piece of land on the site of the proposed third runway called Airplot. Their aim is to maximise the opportunities to put legal obstacles in the way of expansion. Although this action is similar to the tactics first employed in the early 1980s by FoE with the 'Alice's Meadow' campaign; it differs in that it relies on the concept of multiple beneficial ownership rather than the division of the field into microplots. The field was bought for an undisclosed sum from a local land owner. Also in January, Climate Rush staged a "picnic protest" at Heathrow airport against the construction of the third runway. Hundreds of people attended the protest, dressed in Edwardian period dress. In the same month the glass doors of the Department for Transport were also broken by members of the organisation.

In March 2009, senior MPs demanded a Commons investigation into evidence of a "revolving door" policy between Downing Street, Whitehall and BAA Limited (BAA is a major UK airport operator).

Also in March 2009, Plane Stupid protester Leila Deen threw green custard over Business Secretary Lord Mandelson at a low carbon summit hosted by Gordon Brown, in protest at the frequent meetings between Roland Rudd, who represents airport operator BAA, and Mandelson and other ministers in the run-up to Labour's decision to go ahead with plans for a third runway at Heathrow.

Hounslow Council examined the possibility of legal action to prevent expansion, with the support of other London councils and the mayor (Boris Johnson).

In February 2010, The Daily Telegraph reported that the Department for Transport was being investigated by the Information Commissioner's Office and could face a criminal investigation over allegations that it may have deleted or concealed emails to prevent them from being disclosed under the Freedom of Information Act 2000. The investigation followed a complaint by Justine Greening MP.

In March 2010 campaigners "won a High Court battle" when Lord Justice Carnwath ruled that the government's policy support for a third runway would need to be looked at again, and called for a review "of all the relevant policy issues, including the impact of climate change policy". The Department for Transport vowed to "robustly defend" the third runway plan. Following the announcement, Gordon Brown, the prime minister, said it was the right decision, that it was "vital not just to our national economy, but enables millions of citizens to keep in touch with their friends and families" and that the judgement would not change its plans. Shadow transport secretary Theresa Villiers said that the ruling meant "Labour's flagship transport policies were in complete disarray".

On 6 August 2018, lawyers for Friends of the Earth filed papers at the High Court asking for the Airports National Policy Statement (NPS) to be quashed. Friends of the Earth argues that the Airports NPS constitutes a breach of the UK's climate change policy and its sustainable development duties.

Alternatives to expansion 
The main suggested alternatives to Heathrow expansion included:
 greater use of regional airports in the UK
 a new airport elsewhere
 planned greater use of rail travel (including on the controversial High Speed 2 proposal) to reduce domestic flights

Greater use of regional airports 
The United Kingdom has a number of regional airports, which it had been argued can be utilised further to reduce the airport capacity strain on South East England and benefit the whole of the United Kingdom. The 2003 Aviation White Paper mainly argued that increased use of regional airports would increase airport capacity in South East England; and the 2010 coalition government concurred with this view. Politicians proposing this plan included Theresa Villiers and John Leech. Business leaders to back the plan include bosses at Birmingham and Cardiff Airports. The CEO of Manchester Airports Group, the largest British-owned operator of airports and member of the influential Aviation Foundation along with Virgin Atlantic, British Airways and BAA Limited, has also proposed greater use of regional airports.

A number of airline bosses expressed their dissatisfaction at the over-emphasis on the South East in aviation policy. Laurie Berryman of Emirates Airlines said in 2013 that "The business community doesn't want to come to Heathrow or the South East. They would rather fly long-haul from their local airport." A number of airlines have filled in the gap when British Airways have left regional airports over the past decade.

Another major issue at regional airports was "leakage", or passengers who need to get connecting flights from a regional airport to an international airport. Manchester Airport is by far the busiest and largest airport outside South East England, with two runways. Four million passengers – about 20% of all passengers – need to fly from Manchester to London to get connecting long-haul flights abroad. Likewise, many more millions fly from other regional airports to connecting flights in London. Advocates argue that flying to international destinations directly from regional airports would immediately create more airport capacity in the South East at a fraction of the cost and time of having a build a new runway or airport. Furthermore, numerous regional airports are underused, and need no immediate expense to take on more passengers. Manchester is the only airport in the United Kingdom other than Heathrow to have two runways and is severely under capacity: Manchester carries 20 million passengers, but has the capacity to carry at least 50 million.

Proponents of this idea also suggest the new High Speed 2 network will be vital to the success of regional airports in the future. HS2 will link the three airports of Birmingham, Manchester and East Midlands with London. Furthermore, journey times will be competitive: a journey from London Euston to Birmingham Airport will be less than 50 minutes, and to Manchester about 65 minutes – in comparison, the Heathrow Express service to London Paddington takes 25 minutes. Currently rail links exist from London Euston to Birmingham International which takes about 70 minutes, whilst journeys to Manchester take over two hours with a change required at Manchester Piccadilly. It was hoped airlines would create a "north-south hub" with more flights from Manchester, with passengers who live or work in London being only an hour away from the airport – thus spreading demand to regional airports and creating more international hub capacity in the South East.

Thames Estuary Airport 

Since the 1970s, there have been various proposals to complement or replace Heathrow by a new airport in the Thames Estuary. This would have the advantage of avoiding flights taking off and landing over London, with all the accompanying noise and pollution, and would avoid destroying homes, nature and amenity land on the western edge of London. In November 2008, the Mayor of London, Boris Johnson, announced a feasibility study into building an airport on an artificial island off the Isle of Sheppey.

Critics pointed variously to the construction costs, threat to jobs at Heathrow, and opponents in green ideology as with all expansion cite increased  emissions if more flights are scheduled than at present.

Following an election pledge not to build a third runway, Prime Minister David Cameron was keen to implement the Thames Estuary hub.  However, airlines spoke out against plans to partially fund the airport with around £8 billion in landing charges from Heathrow.  An aviation review was set for the end of 2012 and Cameron had advised: "I do understand it is vitally important that we maintain the sort of hub status that Britain has. There are lots of different options that can be looked at."

High-speed rail 

The three main parties represented within the UK support a high-speed railway to the north.

In September 2008, the Conservative opposition proposed such a northern railway and suggested that it would reduce the need for short-haul flights, by encouraging passengers to complete their journey by train instead of flying. By pruning short-haul flights from Heathrow, international flights could increase and so connectivity would be enhanced. The reduction could be 66,430 domestic flights per year, or 30% of the capacity of the third runway.
 In March 2010, in the final months of the Labour government, it published detailed plans for High Speed 2 which would link London with Birmingham and then Scotland, incorporating a new Old Oak Common railway station in West London which would 'improve surface access by rail to Heathrow Airport.' Some "modal shift " to rail from road and air was expected, but not for passengers who arrived at Heathrow by air, who were likely to continue to go by air to their UK destination.

See also 
2016 Richmond Park by-election
Aviation and the environment
Air transport and the environment (United Kingdom)
Heathrow Airport transport proposals
Mitigation of aviation's environmental impact

Notes

References 
Documents referenced from 'Notes' section

  DfT(2009a): 

Other references for article

External links 
Heathrow Expansion, Heathrow Airport official website on the Heathrow expansion plan
BBC NEWS Q&A: A third runway at Heathrow
Heathrow expansion – London Borough of Hillingdon
Heathrow expansion – London Borough of Richmond upon Thames
Stop Heathrow Expansion (campaign group)
Heathrow Association for the Control of Aircraft Noise (HACAN)
Airports Commission: interim report, 17 December 2013
Airports Commission: final report, 1 July 2015

Heathrow Airport
Heathrow Airport Holdings

Proposed transport infrastructure in London